Echium gentianoides is a synonym of Echium thyrsiflorum Masson ex Link., a flowering plant in the borage family Boraginaceae with brilliant blue tubular flowers. It is endemic to the island of La Palma, the Canary Islands. It occurs in one location of La Caldera de Taburiente where it grows in sunny, rocky sites at altitudes higher than 1.800 m. The main threat described for this species is predation by goats and insects.

References

External links

gentianoides
Flora of the Canary Islands